Élie Reclus (July 16, 1827 – February 11 1904) was a French ethnographer and anarchist.

Élie Reclus was the oldest of five brothers, born to a Protestant minister and his wife. His middle three brothers, including the well known anarchist Élisée Reclus, all became geographers.
In 1866 a feminist group called the Société pour la Revendication du Droit des Femmes began to meet at the house of André Léo. Members included Paule Minck, Louise Michel, Eliska Vincent, Élie Reclus and his wife Noémie, Mme Jules Simon and Caroline de Barrau. Maria Deraismes also participated. Because of the broad range of opinions, the group decided to focus on the subject of improving girls' education.

Élie Reclus served as director of the Bibliotheque National in Paris during the Commune de Paris. Condemned par contumace, he went to the United States, then to England, until the French government amnesty in March 1879.
While exiled in London, he presented to the Royal Anthropological Institute of Great Britain and Ireland his first article against circumcision, Circumcision, signification, origins and other similar rituals, in January 1879.

Reclus also taught Charles Fairfield, who was the father of Rebecca West.

Works 
 Many articles in French or foreign journals or magazines, among which:
 Revue de l’Ouest, Bay Saint-Louis (United States)
 Mysl, then Dielo, Saint-Petersburg
 Rousskoïé Slovo
 The Times
 Putnam’s Magazine,
 International, San Francisco)
 La Gironde (« Lettres d’un cosmopolite »)
 La Rive gauche
 La Nouvelle Revue,
 Revue de la Société d’anthropologie
 La Commune
 1864: Introduction to the Dictionnaire des communes de France, in collaboration with Élisée Reclus, Hachette
 1885: Les Primitifs, Chamerot.
 1894: Les Primitifs d’Australie, Dentu.
 1896: Renouveau d’une cité, in collaboration with Élisée Reclus, La Société nouvelle
 1894–1904: conferences at the New University of Brussels on the evolution of religions
 1904–1910, posthumes:
 Le Mariage tel qu’il fut et tel qu’il est, Imprimerie nouvelle, Mons
 La Commune de Paris au jour le jour, Schleicher, reedited in 2011 by the Association Théolib;
 Les Croyances populaires, lessons at the New University
 Le Pain. La Doctrine de Luther, la Société nouvelle
 Les Physionomies végétales, Costes

Notes

Bibliography

Further reading

External links
 
 

1827 births
1904 deaths
Anarchist writers
French anarchists
French male non-fiction writers
French Protestants
Christian anarchists
Elie